Roger Keith Coleman (November 1, 1958 – May 20, 1992) was a convicted murderer and rapist from Grundy, Virginia, USA, who was executed for the rape and murder in March 1981 of his sister-in-law, Wanda McCoy. That day, he had been laid off from work.

Coleman's case drew national and worldwide attention before and after his execution because of his repeated claims of innocence. Appeals were supported by the anti-death penalty movement. After his death, his was the second case nationally in which DNA evidence was analyzed of an executed man. In January 2006, Virginia Governor Mark Warner announced that testing of DNA evidence had conclusively proven that Coleman was guilty of the crime.

Crimes
On April 7, 1977, Coleman knocked on the door to Brenda Rife's home in Grundy and asked for a glass of water. After she allowed him in, Coleman pulled a gun on her, and forced her to tie up her six-year-old daughter. He then walked Rife upstairs to her bedroom at gunpoint, where he told her to undress. When she refused, Coleman ripped open her bathrobe, threw her on the bed, and got on top of her. Rife scratched him on the neck and managed to escape. She then got her daughter and fled the house. Coleman chased them and tried to force them back inside. As the two struggled, Rife managed to grab Coleman's gun, throw it under the porch, and scream for help. As neighbors responded, Coleman fled. He was later convicted of attempted rape and sentenced to three years in prison.

In January 1981, Coleman allegedly exposed himself and masturbated in front of two women, Patricia Hatfield and Jean Gilbert, at a public library. The two women did not know Coleman, but Hatfield encouraged Gilbert, an artist, to draw his face. After showing a police officer the sketch, he suggested that the perpetrator might've been Coleman and encouraged her to check a high school yearbook to see if the faces match. Although Hatfield said the pictures appeared to be a clear match, the police ignored the incident.

Wanda McCoy, 19, was attacked in her home in Grundy on March 10, 1981. She was raped, stabbed to death, and nearly beheaded from severe neck wounds. As there wasn't sign of a struggle, police believed that she had allowed her attacker into the house.

Her sister's husband, Roger Coleman, had access to the house and was quickly considered a suspect due to his prior conviction. Coleman had reported to work that night but left after his shift was dismissed.

Physical evidence at the McCoy house included a fingerprint on the front screen door, a pry mark on the front door molding, and bloodstains inside the house. The victim had broken fingernails; cuts on her hands; and a dark, dusty substance on her body. Flecks of blood found on Coleman's pants were determined to be the same blood type as the victim's. At the time, DNA testing was not available.

Case
At a jury trial in 1982, Coleman was convicted of the rape and capital murder of McCoy.

The prosecution for the case, led by Commonwealth Attorney Michael McGlothlin, asserted:
 The lack of forced entry showed that McCoy knew her attacker.
 Coleman had been previously convicted of attempted rape.
 A hair found on McCoy's body was determined to be similar to Coleman's.
 Blood found on Coleman's clothes was McCoy's blood type.
 A fellow prisoner said that Coleman had privately confessed the crime to him.

Coleman's defense maintained:
 The pry mark on the door indicated forced entry.
 DNA tests of the semen found on the victim's body implicated more than one person.
 The prosecution said that there was no struggle, but the victim had cuts, a bruise in her arm, and broken fingernails.
 Coleman had a documented alibi, and several witnesses gave affidavits.

State appeals
Coleman's initial appeal in 1983 to the Virginia Supreme Court was denied, and the United States Supreme Court denied certiorari. Coleman filed a petition for a writ of habeas corpus in the Circuit Court for Buchanan County, Virginia, raising several federal constitutional claims for the first time. A two-day evidentiary hearing was held, and the court denied all of Coleman's claims. On September 4, 1986, the court entered its final judgment.

Coleman appealed to the Virginia Supreme Court, but the appeal was dismissed on the motion of the Commonwealth since his notice of appeal had not been filed in time. The Virginia Supreme Court requires for a notice of appeal to be filed within 30 days of entry of the final judgment. Coleman's notice of appeal was filed on October 7, which was 33 days after the circuit court had entered its judgment.

Federal petition for habeas corpus
Coleman petitioned in the United States District Court for the Western District of Virginia for a writ of habeas corpus.  However, federal courts may generally not review a state court's denial of a federal constitutional claim if the denial is based on a state procedural default that is both independent of the federal claim and sufficient to support the prisoner's continued custody. Since Coleman was in procedural default of his appeal in state court, that was independent of his federal constitutional claims. That was considered adequate to support his continued custody, and he was ineligible for relief in a federal habeas corpus proceeding. Although finding that Coleman was in procedural default, the District Court addressed all of his claims and found them without merit. The United States Court of Appeals for the Fourth Circuit affirmed the District Court's ruling, as did the US Supreme Court in 1991.

Controversy and execution
In 1990, Coleman's DNA was tested. He was found to be within the 2% of the population who could have committed the crime. Some argued that DNA and blood tests combined reduced this figure to 0.2%.

While he was on death row, Coleman continued to claim his innocence. Because of increasing efforts by opponents of the death penalty in the United States, an international audience became interested in his case. Time magazine featured Coleman on its May 18, 1992 cover. Virginia Governor Douglas Wilder received 13,000 calls and letters about Coleman from around the world, nearly all in favor of clemency. Wilder arranged a secret last-minute polygraph test for Coleman, who failed.

Coleman was executed May 20, 1992 by electric chair. He shared his final meal with James McCloskey, executive director of Centurion Ministries, a group that had been working to prove Coleman's innocence.
His final words were:

An innocent man is going to be murdered tonight. When my innocence is proven, I hope America will realize the injustice of the death penalty as all other civilized countries have. My last words are to the woman I love. Love is eternal. My love for you will last forever. I love you, Sharon. (Sharon Paul was a college student and the girlfriend of Coleman whom he had met by mail during prison.)

In 1998, Chicago lawyer John C. Tucker published May God Have Mercy, detailing his efforts to save Coleman from execution.

DNA testing post-execution
Centurion Ministries and four newspapers, including the Washington Post, sought to have DNA evidence from the case re-examined in 2000. That year was the first instance of a court ordering DNA testing of a man who had been executed for rape and murder: Ellis Wayne Felker in Georgia. The results were inconclusive.

In 2002, the Supreme Court of Virginia declined the request. Centurion Ministries subsequently appealed to Virginia Governor Mark Warner.

On January 5, 2006, Warner ordered the retesting of Coleman's DNA evidence, which was sent to the Centre of Forensic Sciences in Toronto, Canada. It determined that his DNA matched that of semen found at the crime scene, with no exclusions, and that there was only a 1-in-19-million chance of a random match. On January 12, 2006, Warner's office announced that the test results conclusively confirmed Coleman's guilt.

Aftermath
Supporters who believed Coleman's innocence had expected DNA tests to exonerate him, but they were profoundly disappointed. Some death penalty opponents had believed that evidence of an innocent man's execution would have a profound impact on the death penalty debate in the United States, where people on death row had been known to have been exonerated. If Coleman had been proven innocent, it would have contributed to anti-death penalty support. Death penalty supporters argued that Coleman's case showed that the criminal justice system was functioning in having guilty people convicted and executed, and that there was no move to abolish imprisonment even though someone might be mistakenly convicted. McCloskey issued a statement.

See also
 Capital punishment in Virginia
 Capital punishment in the United States
 List of people executed in Virginia

References

Further reading
 Dao, James.  "DNA Ties Man Executed in '92 to the Murder He Denied."  New York Times, January 13, 2006.
 "DNA: Virginia Executed the Right Man," CNN.com, January 12, 2006.
 Glod, Maria and Michael D. Shear.  "DNA Tests Confirm Guilt of Executed Man."  Washington Post, January 13, 2006, p. A1.
 Glod, Maria.  "DNA Tests May Signal Shift in Death Penalty Debate."  Washington Post, January 17, 2006, p. B5.
 Still, Kathy.  "'Tell Them I Said Hello,' He'd Say."  Bristol Herald Courier, January 11, 2006.
 Tanner, Robert.  "DNA Test Confirms Guilt in 1992 Execution"  Associated Press, January 13, 2006.
 "Tests Reaffirm Coleman's Guilt."  Richmond Times-Dispatch, January 12, 2006.
 Willing, Richard.  "DNA Tests Confirm Man Executed in 1992 was Guilty." USA TODAY, January 12, 2006.

External links

 DNA tests confirm executed man's guilt (MSNBC)
 Clark County, Indiana Prosecutors Office site
 Burden of Proof - Washington Post Magazine article examining the case
 Press Release From James C. McCloskey, Executive Director of Centurion Ministries, Inc. and Paul Enzinna, Partner, Baker Botts L.L.P. on the Roger Coleman DNA Testing Results
  from The Malefactor's Register
 Roger Keith Coleman at Find-A-Grave

1958 births
1992 deaths
Executed people from Virginia
20th-century executions by Virginia
People executed by Virginia by electric chair
20th-century executions of American people
People from Grundy, Virginia
People convicted of murder by Virginia
American people executed for murder
American people convicted of rape
American people convicted of attempted rape